The 2016 MSBL season was the 28th season of the Men's State Basketball League (SBL). The regular season began on Friday 18 March, with round 1 seeing a 2015 grand final rematch between the Joondalup Wolves and South West Slammers. The 2016 MSBL All-Star Game was played on 6 June at Bendat Basketball Centre – the home of basketball in Western Australia. The regular season ended on Saturday 30 July. The finals began on Friday 5 August and ended on Saturday 3 September, when the Cockburn Cougars defeated the Wolves in the MSBL Grand Final.

Regular season
The regular season began on Friday 18 March and ended on Saturday 30 July after 20 rounds of competition. The newly-renovated Warwick Stadium hosted big crowds for the Stirling Senators in 2016, while the Perth Redbacks moved home to the Belmont Oasis Leisure Centre after a trial year at Curtin University in 2015. Additionally, due to renovations to the Mandurah Aquatic and Recreation Centre, the Mandurah Magic hosted all of their games in 2016 at the Rockingham Flames' home venue of Mike Barnett Sports Complex.

Standings

Finals
The finals began on Friday 5 August and ended on Saturday 3 September with the MSBL Grand Final.

Bracket

All-Star Game
The 2016 MSBL All-Star Game took place at Bendat Basketball Centre on Monday 6 June, with all proceeds going to Lifeline WA for suicide prevention.

Rosters

Game data

Awards

Player of the Week

Statistics leaders

Regular season
 Most Valuable Player: Cooper Land (Rockingham Flames)
 Coach of the Year: Matt Parsons (Cockburn Cougars)
 Most Improved Player: Jayden Coburn (Stirling Senators)
 All-Star Five:
 PG: Tre Nichols (South West Slammers)
 SG: Matthew Adekponya (Geraldton Buccaneers)
 SF: Gavin Field (Cockburn Cougars)
 PF: Daniel Alexander (Lakeside Lightning)
 C: Marcus Goode (Cockburn Cougars)
 All-Defensive Five:
 PG: Kyle Armour (Willetton Tigers)
 SG: Najee Lane (Cockburn Cougars)
 SF: Ben Purser (Perry Lakes Hawks)
 PF: Maurice Barrow (Geraldton Buccaneers)
 C: Kevin Davis (Joondalup Wolves)

Finals
 Grand Final MVP: Rhett Della Maddalena (Cockburn Cougars)

References

External links
 2016 fixtures
 2016 media guide
 2016 finals structure
 2016 Quarter Finals fixtures
 2016 Semi Finals fixtures
 Mandurah Magic's Setty dominates all-star match
 2016 MSBL Grand Final highlights

2016
2015–16 in Australian basketball
2016–17 in Australian basketball